Rossif may refer to:
 Frédéric Rossif, Yugoslavian film director active in France
 Rossif Sutherland, Canadian actor